Cynthia Cattell is space plasma physicist known her research on solar flares and radiation belts.

Education and career 
Cattell has a B.A. from Hampshire College (1974)  and earned her Ph.D. from the University of California, Berkeley in 1980.

As of 2021, Cattell is a professor in the School of Physics and Astronomy at University of Minnesota.

Research 

Cattell's research on electron holes in space helps explain the release of energy from magnetic explosions in space. Cattell has also examined the energization of electrons in Earth's radiation belt and used satellite data to examine the behavior of ions flowing around Earth. Cattell uses her scientific knowledge to present the public with viewing opportunities to see the Northern Lights.

Selected publications

Awards and honors 

 Fellow, American Geophysical Union (2008)
 Fellow, American Physical Society (2010)

Personal life 
In 2012, Cattell was diagnosed with cancer and was treated with an experimental drug developed by colleagues at University of Minnesota's Masonic Cancer Center. After receiving an increased dosage of an experimental drug there was a reduction in Cattell's tumor and her lymphoma was considered in remission.

References

External links 
 September 18, 2017 talk by Cattell: 

Fellows of the American Geophysical Union
Fellows of the American Physical Society
Hampshire College alumni
Living people
University of California, Berkeley alumni
University of Minnesota faculty
Space scientists
Women physicists
Year of birth missing (living people)